Project Nekton was the codename for a series of very shallow test dives (three of them in Apra Harbor) and also deep-submergence operations in the Pacific Ocean near Guam that ended with the United States Navy-owned research bathyscaphe Trieste entering the Challenger Deep, the deepest surveyed point in the world's oceans.

The series of eight dives began with two harbor dives, then a Pacific Ocean test dive at Guam, by the newly modified Trieste, which had been modified to dive far deeper than before.

The project name was proposed by oceanographer Dr. Robert S. Dietz in early 1958, as plans to modify the Trieste bathyscaphe to go to the deepest part of the oceans were being contemplated. It is in reference to ocean life that actively swims (nekton) as opposed to the plankton organisms that only drift. The bathyscaphe Trieste to be used for Project Nekton was able to move independently, in contrast to tethered bathyspheres. The Trieste featured two electric motors, each with a propeller, of  each. These allowed it to move forward, backward and to turn horizontally.

Objectives

Aside from the prestige of being the first to make the deepest dive, the Navy Electronics Laboratory held the following objectives for Project Nekton in furtherance of its underwater sound research for SOSUS and sonar development:
 precise determination of the sound velocity throughout the water column being explored
 determination of the water column's temperature and salinity structure
 water current measurements
 light penetration, visibility, and bio-luminescence observations
 distribution of organisms under observation in the water column and on the sea floor
 marine geological study of the trench environment
 engineering tests of equipment at great depths
 determination of pressure effects on hull polarity

Operations

Trieste departed San Diego on 5 October 1959 for Guam aboard the freighter SS Santa Mariana to participate in Project Nekton, a series of very deep dives near Guam, culminating in a descent to the Mariana Trench. It had been modified with a larger gasoline float, larger ballast tubs, and a newly designed heavy pressure sphere (made by Krupp in Germany), after having been purchased by the Office of Naval Research, which undertook the modification.

Guam was selected for the test dives because it was a major naval base with complete facilities only  from the Challenger Deep. The tug  towed Trieste between Guam and the dive sites where project flagship  tracked the submerged Trieste with sonar. The first two test dives in the Nekton series were conducted at Guam in the Apra Harbor, then a third dive off the Western flank of Guam reached . This dive was intended to have the same duration as the deep dive for an endurance test to reveal material failures or hazards not encountered during shorter dives. Trieste could surface in 20 minutes from this depth if problems arose, but no problems were encountered.

Fourth dive
The fourth dive in the Nekton series was a very deep dive into the Nero Deep of the Marianas Trench. It was dive 61 in a long series of bathyscaphe dives supervised by Jacques Piccard. Trieste reached , later recalibrated to  depth, to the sea floor, on 15 November 1959. This dive set a new world record depth formerly held by the French Navy for the  descent on their bathyscaphe FNRS-3 off Dakar, Senegal in 1954.

Northeasterly trade winds caused high seas slowing the tow to the dive site, and raising concern about damage to Triestes topside equipment as the she nosed into the waves. Seas moderated on the day of the dive, and pre-dive inspection found no damage. The surface vessels lost underwater telephone contact with Trieste as the bathyscaphe descended below  and communication below that depth was limited to a few manually keyed signal codes from the bathyscaphe transducer. A small boat remained over the dive site while the tug and destroyer stood off  to avoid damaging Trieste if the bathyscaphe surfaced beneath them. Inspection after returning to Guam revealed some water leakage along the seals between the three sections of the sphere. Trieste was taken out of the water to replace the epoxy glue seals and augment them with mechanical holding ring bands. Some new instrumentation was also installed during this repair period.

Dive 62 (fifth in the Nekton series) was another Apra Harbor dive to test the new instrumentation. There was also some concern about possible leakage between the bathyscaphe sphere segments near the surface, although pressure was expected to seal the joints at depth. The next dive (sixth in the series, dive 63 for Piccard) was another checkout dive on 18 December, west of Guam. It reached  to test the holding bands and new instrumentation at that depth. Although not usually considered as part of the counted series, there were five shallow  dives for crew training purposes in Apra Harbor before the next deep dive of the series.

Seventh dive

Topside damage to the gasoline release valve prevented negative buoyancy adjustment after ballast had been released when the bottom was sounded, and once rising, the bathyscaphe could not be stopped. The crew was startled by implosion noises as Trieste descended past . A portable navigation light which should have been removed prior to diving imploded, and a topside pipe stanchion recently installed for safety purposes collapsed because no compensating holes had been drilled. The implosions caused no structural or instrument damage, and a newly installed underwater telephone allowed voice communication with the surface at greater depths.

Diving into the Challenger Deep

Lewis arrived at the dive site on 20 January to locate the Challenger Deep for Triestes dive. The ship's fathometer was not designed for such depths. Lewis made depth determinations by dropping explosive charges over the side and timing the interval between the explosion and the return echo.

On dive 65 (eighth in the Nekton series), on 23 January 1960, Trieste reached the ocean floor in the Challenger Deep (the deepest southern part of the Mariana Trench), carrying Jacques Piccard (son of the boat's designer Auguste Piccard) and Lieutenant Don Walsh, USN. This was the first time a vessel, manned or unmanned, had reached the deepest point in the Earth's oceans.

After passing  one of the outer Plexiglas window panes cracked, shaking the entire vessel. The two men spent barely twenty minutes at the ocean floor, eating chocolate bars to keep their strength. The temperature in the cabin was a mere  at the time. While on the bottom at maximum depth, Piccard and Walsh unexpectedly regained the ability to communicate with Wandank using a sonar/hydrophone voice communications system. At a speed of almost  (about five times the speed of sound in air), it took about seven seconds for a voice message to travel from the craft to the surface ship and another seven seconds for answers to return.

While on the bottom, Piccard and Walsh reported they observed a number of small sole and flounder swimming away, indicating that at least some vertebrate life might withstand the extremes of pressure in any of the Earth's oceans. They noted that the floor of the Challenger Deep consisted of "diatomaceous ooze". The ascent to surface took three hours, fifteen minutes.

Successor exploration programs in the Challenger Deep 

The next manned craft to reach the bottom of the Challenger Deep was Deepsea Challenger, on 25 March 2012. A Japanese robotic craft Kaikō reached the bottom of the Challenger Deep in 1995. The Nereus hybrid remotely operated vehicle (HROV) reached the bottom on 31 May 2009.

References

Trieste-class deep-submergence vehicle